Men of Steel is a 1926 American silent drama film directed by George Archainbaud and starring Milton Sills, Doris Kenyon, and May Allison.

The film's sets were designed by the art director Milton Menasco.

Cast
 Milton Sills as Jan Bokak  
 Doris Kenyon as Mary Berwick 
 May Allison as Clare Pitt  
 Victor McLaglen as Pete Masarick  
 Frank Currier as Cinder Pitt  
 George Fawcett as Hooker Grimes  
 John Kolb as Anton Berwick  
 Harry Lee as Frazer 
 Henry West as Wolfe  
 Taylor Graves as Alex

References

Bibliography
 Michael Slade Shull. Radicalism in American Silent Films, 1909-1929: A Filmography and History. McFarland, 2000.

External links

1926 films
1926 drama films
Silent American drama films
Films directed by George Archainbaud
American silent feature films
1920s English-language films
American black-and-white films
1920s American films